The Tate Baronetcy, of Park Hill in Streatham in the County of London, is a title in the baronetage of the United Kingdom. It was created on 27 June 1898 for the sugar magnate and philanthropist Henry Tate. He gave Tate Gallery to the nation. The second baronet was high sheriff of Lancashire in 1907. The fourth baronet served as high sheriff of Rutland from 1949 to 1950. The fifth baronet served as managing director of the family company, Tate & Lyle, and was later chairman of the London Futures & Options Exchange.

As of 2014, the title is held by the latter's son, the sixth baronet, who succeeded in 2012. As of 28 February 2014, the present baronet has not successfully proven his succession and is therefore not on the Official Roll of the Baronetage, with the baronetcy considered 'vacant'.

Tate baronets, of Park Hill (1898)
Sir Henry Tate, 1st Baronet (1819–1899)
Sir William Henry Tate, 2nd Baronet (1842–1921)
Sir Ernest William Tate, 3rd Baronet (1867–1939)
Sir Henry Tate, 4th Baronet (1902–1994)
Sir (Henry) Saxon Tate, 5th Baronet (1931–2012)
Sir Edward Nicholas Tate, 6th Baronet (born 1966)

The heir presumptive is the present holder's brother Duncan Saxon Tate (born 1968).

References

Kidd, Charles, Williamson, David (editors). Debrett's Peerage and Baronetage (1990 edition). New York: St Martin's Press, 1990.

Tate